Fiona Henrietta Emilie "Fieps" van Tuyll van Serooskerken (born 29 May 1964) is a Dutch equestrian. She competed in the individual eventing at the 1992 Summer Olympics.

References

External links
 

1964 births
Living people
Dutch female equestrians
Olympic equestrians of the Netherlands
Equestrians at the 1992 Summer Olympics
Sportspeople from London
20th-century Dutch women